Bashir Ahmed (born 23 December 1934) is a Pakistani former field hockey player. He won the gold medal in 1960 Summer Olympics.

References

External links
 

1934 births
Living people
Pakistani male field hockey players
Olympic field hockey players of Pakistan
Olympic gold medalists for Pakistan
Olympic medalists in field hockey
Medalists at the 1960 Summer Olympics
Field hockey players at the 1960 Summer Olympics
Asian Games medalists in field hockey
Field hockey players at the 1962 Asian Games
Field hockey players from Karachi
Asian Games gold medalists for Pakistan

Medalists at the 1962 Asian Games
20th-century Pakistani people